Julian Shaw (born 16 December 1985 in Wellington, New Zealand) is an author, filmmaker and actor, best known for directing the 2007 film Darling! The Pieter-Dirk Uys Story, a British Film Institute award-winning documentary about the life of South African political satirist Pieter-Dirk Uys. Shaw is the author of the novel Modern Odysseus, and the creator of several short films including Clearing the Air. He is the director of the 2011 feature documentary Cup of Dreams, about New Zealand’s national Rugby Union team the All Blacks. Shaw also gained worldwide fame in 2011 after starring in an Australian marriage equality advertisement entitled It's Time that has reached millions of people.

International awards 
Young Australian Filmmaker of the Year Award, 2010 - Byron Bay International Film Festival and Sydney International Film School
Inaugural Derek Oyston/Che Award - British Film Institute's London Lesbian and Gay Film Festival, 2009
Runner-Up: Panorama Audience Award, for Darling! The Pieter-Dirk Uys Story - Berlin International Film Festival, 2008
Independent Spirit Award - Inside Film Awards, 2007
Best Emerging Filmmaker Award - DOCNZ, 2007
Best Documentary for Darling! The Pieter-Dirk Uys Story - Documentary Edge Festival, 2007

Filmography

Actor
Stoner, San Andreas (film) 2015
"It's Time", GetUp! for Australia Ad, 2011
 Christopher, Love Gone Wrong, Deadly Women

Director
Cup of Dreams, 2011
Clearing the Air, 2010
All Blacks Don't Cry, 2010
Darling! The Pieter-Dirk Uys Story, 2007

Performer
"Love Story", a 2011 viral video in support of marriage equality by GetUp! Australia, as Paul
All Blacks Don't Cry, 2010, as John Kirwan

Bibliography 
Modern Odysseus, 2009 -

References

External links

New Zealand film directors
Living people
New Zealand male film actors
1985 births
Male actors from Wellington City
21st-century New Zealand male actors